The Naish languages are a low-level subgroup of Sino-Tibetan languages that include Naxi, Na (Mosuo), and Laze.

Classification
The Naish languages are:
Naish
Naxi
Na (Narua, Mosuo)
Laze

In turn, Naish together with Namuyi and Shixing constitutes the Naic subgroup within Sino-Tibetan.

Arguments for relatedness include irregular morphotonology: tone patterns of numeral-plus-classifier phrases that constitute shared structural properties. Since these similarities are phonetically nontransparent, they cannot be due to borrowing.

Names
Note that in Mainland China, the term "Naxi" is commonly used for the entire language group, e.g. by the influential linguistic introduction by He and Jiang (2015). The terms "Naish" and "Naic" are derived from the endonym Na used by speakers of several of the languages. These concepts were initially proposed by Guillaume Jacques & Alexis Michaud (2011). Phylogenetic issues are summarized in the entry about the Naic subgroup. For a review of the literature about Naish languages, see Li (2015).

Lexical innovations
Jacques & Michaud (2011) list the following words as Naish lexical innovations.

Reconstruction
Proto-Naish, the proto-language ancestral to the Naish languages, has been reconstructed by Jacques & Michaud (2011).

See also
List of Proto-Naish reconstructions (Wiktionary)

References